Puya fiebrigii is a species in the genus Puya. This species is endemic to Bolivia.

References

fiebrigii
Flora of Bolivia